The history of the Church of the East in India is dated to 52 AD by apocryphal sources and to the 9th century by the Quilon Syrian copper plates, the latter of which is considered the earliest reputable dating for Christians in the Indian subcontinent. 

According to apocryphal records, Christianity in India and in Pakistan (included prior to the Partition) commenced in 52 AD, with the arrival of Thomas the Apostle in Cranganore (Kodungaloor).  Subsequently, the Christians of the Malabar region, known as St Thomas Christians established close ties with the Levantine Christians of the Near East. They eventually coalesced into the Church of the East led by the Catholicos-Patriarch of Seleucia-Ctesiphon.

The Church of the East was often separated from the other ancient churches due to its location in the Parthian Empire, an ancient rival of the (Byzantine) Greek and (Latin) Roman Empires. When Archbishop Nestorius of Constantinople was declared a heretic by the Council of Ephesus, the Church of the East refused to acknowledge his deposition because he held the same christological position. Later, the "Anaphora of Mar Nestorius" came to be used by Church of the East, which for this reason has been pejoratively labelled the "Nestorian Church" by its theological opponents.

When the Portuguese Inquisition in Goa and Bombay-Bassein was established in the 16th century, they opposed the East Syriac rite of Christian worship in what was Portuguese Cochin. After the schism of 1552, a section of the Church of the East became Catholic (modern-day Chaldean Catholic Church), both the traditional (Nestorian)  and Chaldean patriarchates intermittently attempted to regain their following in the Indian subcontinent by sending their prelate to the Malabarese Christians. Occasionally the Vatican supported the claim of the bishop from the Chaldean Church of Ctesiphon. But the Synod of Diamper in 1599, overseen by Aleixo de Menezes, the Portugal-backed-Archbishop of Goa, replaced the East Syriac bishop of St Thomas Christians and placed them under the Portuguese Padroado backed bishop. After that any attempts of Thomas Christians to contact bishops — even Chaldian Catholic ones — in the Middle East were foiled.

Mar John, Metropolitan of India (1122 AD)

In 1122, Mar John, Metropolitan-designate of India, with his suffragens went to Constantinople, thence to Rome, and received the pallium from Pope Callixtus II. He related to the Pope and the cardinals the miracles that were wrought at the tomb of St. Thomas at Mylapore. These visits, apparently from the Saint Thomas Christians of India, cannot be confirmed, as evidence of both is only available from secondary sources. Later, a letter surfaced during the 1160s claiming to be from Prester John. There were over one hundred different versions of the letter published over the next few centuries. Most often, the letter was addressed to Emanuel I, the Byzantine Emperor of Rome, though some were addressed to the Pope or the King of France.

A Latin text with its Hebrew translation reads as follows:

"Praete janni invenitur ascendendo in Kalicut in arida..."

This is true proof and well-known knowledge about the Jews who are found there near Prester John.

Reading the Hebrew letters of Prester John shows that Prester John lived in India; or to be more precise, in Malabar (southern India).

Connecting Prester John with India is inevitable from the Hebrew text on the one hand, while parts of the legend will support the Indian origin on the other. Firstly, India is mentioned several times in these letters (pp. 41, 89, 107, 119, and more). Secondly, Kalicut which was one of the most important port cities in Malabar (the place where Vasco da Gama was sent), is mentioned in one of the letters. Thirdly, these facts would definitely suffice, but further evidence appears in the form of this statements:

In ... India is buried the body of St Thomas the Apostle.

That is, the author knew that St. Thomas was buried in India, a belief held by the Christians of southern India. Not only that, but the author of the letters knew (p. 133) about "St. Thomas holiday", which is, apparently, St. Thomas Memorial Day held by the same Christians on 3 July.

Fourth, the author of the letters mentioned that pepper grew in his land (pp. 55, 91, 131), pepper being common in Malabar. Fifth, there are some stories in the letters concerning warriors riding elephants. It is well known that, unlike the African elephant, only the Asian elephant could be trained.

Mar Ya'qob Metropolitan of India and Patriarch Yahballaha III

At the beginning of the fourteenth century, the Indian church was again dependent upon the Church of the East. The dating formula in the colophon to a manuscript copied in June 1301 in the church of Mar Quriaqos in Cranganore mentions Patriarch Yahballaha III (whom it calls Yahballaha V) and Metropolitan Yaqob of India. Cranganore, described in this manuscript as "the royal city", was doubtless the metropolitan seat of India at this time.

In the 1320s, the anonymous biographer of the patriarch Yahballaha III and his friend Rabban Bar Sauma praised the achievement of the Church of the East in converting "the Indians, Chinese and Turks". India was listed as one of the Church of the East's "provinces of the exterior" by the historian Amr in 1348.

Yahballaha maintained contacts with the Byzantine Empire and with Latin Christendom. In 1287, when Abaqa Khan's son and successor Arghun Khan sought an ambassador for an important mission to Europe, Yaballaha recommended his former teacher Rabban Bar Sauma, who held the position of Visitor-general. Arghun agreed, and Bar Sauma made a historic journey through Europe; meeting with the Pope and many monarchs; and bringing gifts, letters, and European ambassadors with him on his return. Via Rabban Sauma, Yahballaha received a ring from the Pope's finger, and a papal bull which recognized Yahballaha as the patriarch of all the eastern Christians.

In May 1304, Yahballaha made profession of the Catholic faith in a letter addressed to Pope Benedict XI. But a union with Rome was blocked by his Nestorian bishops.

Udayamperoor (known as Diamper in Portuguese), the capital of this kingdom, was the venue of the famous Synod of Diamper of 1599. It was held in the All Saints Church there. The venue was apparently chosen on account of the place having been the capital of a Christian principality.

Synod of Diamper and suppression of East Syriac jurisdiction in India 

In 1552, there was a schism in the Church of the East and a faction led by Mar Yohannan Sulaqa declared allegiance to Rome. When, on 6 April 1553, Pope Julius III confirmed Yohannan Sulaqa as Chaldean Patriarch, the Pope said that the discipline and liturgy of the Chaldeans had already been approved by his predecessors, Nicholas I (858-867), Leo X (1513–1521), and Clement VII (1523–1534). Thus, parallel to the "traditionalist" (often referred as Nestorian) Patriarchate, the "Chaldean" Patriarchate in communion with Rome came into existence and both traditionalist and Chaldean factions began sending their own bishops to Malabar.

When the Portuguese arrived in Malabar, they assumed that the four bishops present were Nestorian. Their report of 1504, addressed to the Chaldean Patriarch, their being startled by the absence of images and by the use of leavened bread; but this was in accordance with Chaldean usage. The Christians paid the expenses of the Papal delegate Marignoli.

The Synod of Diamper of 1599 marked the formal subjugation of the Malabar Syriac Christian community to the Latin Church. It implemented various liturgical and structural reforms in the Indian Church. The diocese of Angamaly, which was now formally placed under the Portuguese Padroado and made suffragan to the archdiocese of Goa. The east syriac bishop was then removed from jurisdiction in India and replaced by a latin bishop; the East Syriac liturgy of Addai and Mari was “purified from error”; and Latin vestments, rituals, and customs were introduced to replace the ancient traditions.

Accounts of foreign missionaries

Francis Xavier wrote a letter dated 26 January 1549, from Cochin to king John III of Portugal, in which he declared that:

...a bishop of Armenia (Mesopotamia) by the name of Jacob Abuna has been serving God and Your Highness in these regions for forty-five years. He is a very old, virtuous, and saintly man, and, at the same time, one who has been neglected by Your Highness and by almost all of those who are in India. God is granting him his reward, since he desires to assist Him by himself, without employing us as a means to console his servants. He is being helped here solely by the priests of St. Francis. Y. H. should write a very affectionate letter to him, and one of its paragraphs should include an order recommending him to the governors, to the veadores da fazenda, and to the captains of Cochin so that he may receive the honour and respect which he deserves when he comes to them with a request on behalf of the Christians of St. Thomas. Your Highness should write to him and earnestly entreat him to undertake the charge of recommending you to God, since YH. has a greater need of being supported by the prayers of the bishop than the bishop has need of the temporal assistance of Y.H. He has endured much in his work with the Christians of St Thomas."Christen und Gewürze" : Konfrontation und Interaktion kolonialer und indigener Christentumsvarianten Klaus Koschorke (Hg.)Book in German, English, Spanish, 1998 Page 31,32 

In that same year, Francis Xavier also wrote to his Jesuit colleague and Provincial of Portugal, Fr. Simon Rodrigues, giving him the following description:

Fifteen thousand paces from Cochin there is a fortress owned by the king with the name of Cranganore. It has a beautiful college, built by Frey [Wente], a companion of the bishop, in which there are easily a hundred students, sons of native Christians, who are named after St. Thomas. There are sixty villages of these Thomas Christians around this fortress, and the students for the college as I have said, are obtained from them. There are two churches in Cranganore, one of St. Thomas, which is highly revered by the Thomas Christians.

This attitude of St. Francis Xavier, and of the Franciscans before him, does not reflect any of the animosity and intolerance that kept creeping in with the spread of the Tridentine spirit of the Counter-Reformation, which tended to foster a uniformity of belief and practice. It is possible to follow the lines of argument of young Portuguese historians, such as Joéo Paulo Oliveira e Cosca, yet such arguments seem to discount the Portuguese cultural nationalism in their colonial expansion and the treatment of the natives. Documents recently found in the Portuguese national archives help to confirm a greater openness or pragmatism in the first half of the 16th century.

See also 
Gondophares
St Gaspar
India (East Syriac ecclesiastical province)
Malankara-Persian ecclesiastical relations
Assyrian Church of the East in India

Notes

Bibliography

 
 
 
 
 
 
 
 
 
English translation: 

 
 
 
  
Reprinted in: 
 
 
 
 
Reprinted in 
 

History of Christianity in India
Saint Thomas Christians